This is a list of rural localities in Perm Krai. Perm Krai is a federal subject of Russia (a krai) that came into existence on December 1, 2005 as a result of the 2004 referendum on the merger of Perm Oblast and Komi-Permyak Autonomous Okrug. The city of Perm is the administrative center. Population: 2,635,276 (2010 Census).

Alexandrovsky District 
Rural localities in Alexandrovsky District:

 Bashmaki
 Baza
 Bolshaya Vilva
 Bulatovo
 Chikman
 Galka
 Garnova
 Gora
 Ivakinsky Karyer
 Kamen
 Karyer Izvestnyak
 Klestovo
 Lytvensky
 Lyuzen
 Makhneva
 Malaya Vilva
 Nizhnyaya
 Podsludnoye
 Shumkovo
 Skopkortnaya
 Sukhaya
 Taly
 Ust-Igum

Bardymsky District 
Rural localities in Bardymsky District:

 Akbash
 Amirovka
 Barda
 Bichurino
 Sarashi
 Yelpachikha

Beryozovsky District 
Rural localities in Beryozovsky District:

 Antonkovo
 Asovo
 Bartovo
 Bartym
 Basargi
 Bateriki
 Baykino
 Bereznik
 Berezovaya Gora
 Beryozovka
 Borodino
 Brod
 Demidyata
 Fedotovo
 Galashino
 Gladkovo
 Issinyayevo
 Karnaukhovo (Beryozovskoye Rural Settlement)
 Karnaukhovo (Zaboryinskoye Rural Settlement)
 Kharino
 Klyapovo
 Klychi
 Kopchikovo
 Kostyata
 Machino (Beryozovskoye Rural Settlement)
 Machino (Klyapovskoye Rural Settlement)
 Makhtyata
 Malaya Sosnovka
 Malyshi
 Markovo
 Martely
 Metalnikovo
 Misilyata
 Molyobka
 Nizhniye Isady
 Osinovo
 Palnik
 Pechatka
 Pentyurino
 Perebor
 Pirozhkovo
 Podperebor
 Podvoloshino
 Pokrovka
 Polchata
 Polushkino
 Potanitsy
 Pozdyanka
 Pronosnoye
 Puzdrino
 Ryazany
 Ryzhkovo
 Samokhino
 Saya
 Sazhino
 Selezni
 Shakva
 Shestaki
 Shishkino
 Shulgino
 Shumkovo
 Sosnovka (Asovskoye Rural Settlement)
 Sosnovka (Sosnovskoye Rural Settlement)
 Starkovo
 Taranysh
 Tarnaboyevo
 Taz Russky
 Taz Tatarsky
 Timyata
 Tokmany
 Tulumbasy
 Tuyasy
 Urai
 Uraskovo
 Vanino
 Vankino
 Verkhniye Isady
 Vilisovo
 Volodino
 Yaburovo
 Yepishata
 Yermolino
 Zaborye
 Zernino

Bolshesosnovsky District 
Rural localities in Bolshesosnovsky District:

 Baklushi
 Berdyshevo
 Bolshaya Sosnova
 Bolshiye Kizeli
 Burdino
 Cherknukhi
 Chernovskoye
 Chistoperevoloka
 Dolgany
 Drobiny
 Gari
 Gladky Mys
 Kiprino
 Klenovka
 Kolokolovo
 Kozhino
 Krasny Yar
 Krasnyye Gorki
 Kuzino
 Kuznetsy
 Lisya
 Lyagushino
 Lykovo
 Lyovino
 Malaya Sosnova
 Malinovka
 Malyye Kizeli
 Marasany
 Medvedevo
 Nizhny Lyp
 Osinovka
 Permyaki
 Petropavlovsk
 Pichugi
 Pikuli
 Ploska
 Polozovo
 Pozory
 Razvily
 Russky Lem
 Seletki
 Shamary
 Sivinskoye
 Solody
 Stafiyata
 Stary Lyp
 Tarakanovo
 Toykino
 Vakhrino
 Vary
 Verkh-Potka
 Verkh-Shestaya
 Yasnaya Polyana
 Yurkovo
 Yuzhny
 Zabolotovo
 Zachernaya
 Zagibovka
 Zhelnino

Chastinsky District 
Rural localities in Chastinsky District:

 Chastye

Chaykovsky 
Rural localities in Chaykovsky urban okrug:

 Alnyash
 Amaneyevo
 Bolshoy Bukor
 Bormist
 Burenka
 Dubovaya
 Foki
 Kauchuk
 Kemul
 Kirillovka
 Maly Bukor
 Markovo
 Mokhovaya
 Nekrasovo
 Opary
 Prikamsky
 Romanyata
 Rusalevka
 Sarapulka
 Sosnovo
 Stepanovo
 Uralskoye
 Vanki
 Vassyata
 Vekoshinka
 Zasechny
 Zipunovo

Cherdynsky District 
Rural localities in Cherdynsky District:

 Abog
 Ambor
 Bayandina
 Baydary
 Bigichi
 Bolshaya Anikovskaya
 Bolshiye Doldy
 Bolshoy Kikus
 Bondyug
 Buldyrya
 Iskor
 Istok
 Kamgort
 Kiryanova
 Kolchug
 Kolva
 Kornino
 Kupchik
 Kurgan
 Kushmangort
 Limezh
 Lobanikha
 Malyye Doldy
 Marusheva
 Nizhneye Kerchevo
 Nizhny Shaksher
 Olkhovka
 Petretsovo
 Pilva
 Pokcha
 Redikor
 Ryabinino
 Savina
 Shishigino
 Urol
 Ust-Urolka
 Valay
 Verkhneye Kerchevo
 Verkhnyaya Kolva
 Vilisova
 Vizhaikha
 Vizhay
 Yaranina
 Yezova

Chernushinsky District 
Rural localities in Chernushinsky District:

 Agarzinsky
 Agarzya
 Aminkay
 Ananyino
 Anastasino
 Andronovo
 Ashsha
 Atnyashka
 Azinsky
 Baranovo
 Bedryazh
 Berezovka
 Bikulka
 Bizyar
 Bogatovka
 Bolshoy Bereznik
 Bolshoy Ulyk
 Bolshoy Yug
 Bolshoye Kachino
 Brod
 Demenyovo
 Detkino
 Gari
 Ivanovka
 Kalinovka
 Kamennyye Klyuchi
 Kapkan
 Karamorka
 Kazantsevo
 Komarovo
 Korobeyniki
 Kuznetsovo
 Leninsky
 Lysaya Gora
 Malanichi
 Nikolayevsky
 Nizhny Kozmyash
 Nizhnyaya Kuba
 Olkhovka
 Orekhovaya Gora
 Osinovaya Gora
 Pavlovka
 Pokrovka
 Rakino
 Ryabki
 Sludka
 Srednyaya Kuba
 Strezh
 Sulmash
 Tanypskiye Klyuchi
 Taush
 Teklovka
 Temnoye
 Troitsk
 Trun
 Trun
 Trushniki
 Tyuy
 Ulyanovka
 Ustinovo
 Verkh-Kiga
 Verkh-Yemash
 Verkhny Kozmyash
 Vinokurovo
 Yemash-Pavlovo
 Yermiya
 Yesaul
 Yetysh
 Zverevo

Chusovoy 
Rural localities in Chusovoy urban okrug:

 Syola
 Uspenka

Dobryanka 
Rural localities in Dobryanka urban okrug:

 Divya

Dobryansky District 
Rural localities in Dobryansky District:

 29 km
 5 km
 Adishchevo
 Batashata
 Berdnikovshchina
 Besmelyata
 Besovo
 Bobki (settlement)
 Bobki (village)
 Bobovaya
 Bolshoye Spitsino
 Bolshoye Zapolye
 Bor-Lyonva
 Borodkino
 Borovkovo
 Boyanovo
 Chyolva
 Fominka
 Gari
 Golubyata
 Gorodishche
 Gory
 Gryaznukha
 Gurino
 Ivanovka
 Kamsky
 Kanyuki
 Klyuchi
 Komarovo
 Konets Gor
 Kononovo
 Konstantinovka
 Korolevo
 Krasnaya Sludka
 Krasnoye
 Krutikovo
 Kukhtym (railway station settlement)
 Kukhtym (settlement)
 Kuligino
 Kulikovo
 Kunya
 Kyzh (settlement)
 Kyzh (village)
 Lipovo
 Lunezhki
 Lyabovo
 Merkushevo
 Milkovo
 Mokhovo
 Monastyr
 Mutnaya (settlement)
 Mutnaya (village)
 Nekhayka
 Nikulino
 Nikulyata
 Nizhneye Krasnoye
 Nizhneye Zadolgoye
 Nizhny Lukh
 Oktyabrsky
 Olkhovka
 Omelichi
 Pakhnino
 Palniki
 Patraki
 Penki
 Pomortsevo
 Rassokhi
 Rodniki
 Rogovik
 Shemeti
 Shkaryata
 Sofronyata
 Tabory (selo)
 Tabory (settlement)
 Talitsa
 Tikhaya
 Traktovy
 Tulka
 Tyus
 Ust-Shalashnaya
 Vetlyany
 Vilva
 Visim
 Yaganyata
 Yarino (settlement)
 Yarino (village)
 Yaroslavshchina
 Yelniki
 Yershovka
 Zaborye
 Zakharovtsy
 Zalesnaya
 Zavozhik
 Zvony

Gaynsky District 
Rural localities in Gaynsky District:

 Ankudinovo
 Bazuyevo
 Chazhegovo
 Churtan
 Danilovo
 Gayny
 Imasy
 Isayevo
 Kasimovka
 Kebraty
 Keros
 Kharino
 Krasnoyary
 Krasny Yar
 Lel
 Lunym
 Modorobo
 Monastyr
 Nikonovo
 Onyl
 Pugvin Mys
 Serebryanka
 Seyva
 Shipitsino
 Shordyn
 Sosnovaya
 Tiunovo
 Tyla
 Ust-Chukurya
 Ust-Chyornaya
 Ust-Veslyana
 Vaskino
 Verkhny Budym
 Verkhnyaya Staritsa
 Yelevo
 Zhemchuzhny

Gornozavodsky District 
Rural localities in Gornozavodsky District:

 Biser
 Koyva
 Laki
 Srednyaya Usva
 Ust-Koyva
 Ust-Tiskos
 Ust-Tyrym
 Vilva
 Vizhay
 Yevropeyskaya

Gremyachinsky 
Rural localities in Gremyachinsky urban okrug:

 Baseg
 Bezgodovo
 Shumikhinsky
 Yubileyny
 Zagotovka

Gubakhinsky 
Rural localities in Gubakhinsky urban okrug:

 Klyuchi
 Nagornsky
 Parma
 Shestaki

Ilyinsky District 
Rural localities in Ilyinsky District:

 Ilyinsky
 Ivanovskoye
 Podbornaya

Karagaysky District 
Rural localities in Karagaysky District:

 Karagay
 Kotelniki
 Kozmodemyansk
 Mendeleyevo
 Nizhny Kushcher
 Obvinsk
 Yarino

Kishertsky District 
Rural localities in Kishertsky District:

 Andreyevo
 Borovchata
 Brazhata
 Burylovo
 Byrma
 Chechenino
 Chernoyarskaya Odina
 Chyorny Yar
 Dom otkykha 'Krasny Yar'
 Fomichi
 Gari
 Garino
 Ilyata
 Kordon
 Korsaki
 Lebedyata
 Lyok
 Makaryata
 Mazuyevka
 Mecha
 Medvedovo
 Molyobka
 Nizkoye
 Osintsevo
 Parunovo
 Pashyovo
 Petryata
 Posad
 Seda
 Shamaryata
 Shumkovo
 Spaso-Barda
 Sukhoy Log
 Ust-Kishert
 Verkhnyaya Opalikha
 Verkhnyaya Solyanka
 Yevdokino

Kizel 
Rural localities in Kizel urban okrug:

 Severny-Kospashsky
 Shakhta

Kochyovsky District 
Rural localities in Kochyovsky District:

 Abramovka
 Akilovo
 Arkhipovo
 Bazhovo
 Belenkovo
 Bogolyubovo
 Bolshaya Kocha
 Bolshoy Palnik
 Borino
 Buzhdym
 Demidovka
 Durovo
 Dyoma
 Dyomino
 Gaintsevo
 Gordeyevo
 Khazovo
 Kochyovo
 Krasnaya Kurya
 Kukushka
 Kuzmyno
 Kyshka
 Lobozovo
 Lyagayevo
 Mara-Palnik
 Maraty
 Maskal
 Mitino
 Moskvino
 Oktyabrsky
 Oshovo
 Otopkovo
 Oy-Pozhum
 Palkoyag
 Parmaylovo
 Pelym
 Petrushino
 Petukhovo
 Polozayka
 Proshino
 Puzym
 Pystogovo
 Salnikovo
 Sepol
 Serva
 Shansherevo
 Shipitsino
 Shorsha
 Sizovo
 Slepoyevo
 Syulkovo
 Tarasovo
 Tashka
 Tubyzovo
 Urya
 Urzha
 Ust-Onolva
 Ust-Silayka
 Ust-Yancher
 Vaskino
 Vershinino
 Vezhayka
 Vorobyovo
 Yukseyevo
 Zapoltsevo
 Zuyevo
 Zyryanovo

Kosinsky District 
Rural localities in Kosinsky District:

 Abramovo
 Bachmanovo
 Baranovo
 Chazyovo
 Chirkovo
 Churaki
 Dederuy
 Demidovo
 Denino
 Fomichevo
 Gavrikovo
 Gorki
 Gortlud
 Grishkino
 Karchyoy
 Kirshino
 Kordon
 Kosa
 Krasnobay
 Krivtsy
 Levichi
 Loch-Say
 Lyampino
 Maskali
 Mys
 Natyaino
 Nesoli
 Nizhnyaya Kosa
 Novaya Svetlitsa
 Novoye Gushchino
 Novozhilovo
 Odan
 Panino
 Peklayb
 Podgora
 Podyachevo
 Poroshevo
 Puksib
 Pyatigory
 Pydosovo
 Solym
 Sosnovka
 Sredneye Bachmanovo
 Staroye Gushchino
 Trifanovo
 Ust-Kosa
 Varysh
 Verkh-Lel
 Voyvyl
 Zinkovo

Krasnovishersky District 
Rural localities in Krasnovishersky District:

 Akchim
 Antipina
 Arefina
 Bakhari
 Berezovaya Staritsa
 Boloto
 Bulatovo
 Bychina
 Danilov Lug
 Grishina
 Gubdor
 Ivachina
 Konovalova
 Kotomysh
 Mutikha
 Naberezhny
 Nizhneye Zapolye
 Nizhnyaya Bychina
 Nizhnyaya Yazva
 Oralovo
 Parshakova
 Rategova
 Romanikha
 Severny Kolchim
 Seysmopartiya
 Simanova
 Storozhevaya
 Sypuchi
 Sysoyeva
 Talavol
 Tsepel
 Ust-Yazva
 Vankova
 Vaya
 Vels
 Verkh-Yazva
 Verkhneye Zapolye
 Visherogorsk
 Volynka
 Yaborova
 Yegorova
 Zagovorukha
 Zolotanka

Kudymkarsky District 
Rural localities in Kudymkarsky District:

 Alekova
 Alexandrova
 Alexeyevka
 Amonova
 Ananyeva
 Andriyanova
 Andropova
 Anikina
 Antonova
 Arazayeva
 Arefyeva
 Arkhipova
 Artamonova
 Bagrova
 Balkachi
 Baranova (Oshibskoye Rural Settlement)
 Baranova (Stepanovskoye Rural Settlement)
 Batina
 Beloyevo
 Berezovka
 Bolka
 Bolshaya Serva
 Bolshaya Sidorova
 Borisova
 Bormotova
 Boyarskaya
 Brazhkina
 Bryushinina
 Burlova
 Buslayeva
 Bystry
 Chakileva
 Chashchilova
 Chaverina
 Cheremnova
 Chukyleva
 Danshina
 Demina
 Demino
 Derskanova
 Devina
 Dodonova
 Erna
 Fadeyeva
 Fedotova
 Filayeva
 Gabova
 Galina
 Galyukova
 Ganina
 Gavrilova
 Gavrukova
 Gayshor
 Golubkova
 Gordina
 Grishuneva
 Gurina (Verkh-Invenskoye Rural Settlement)
 Gurina (Yogvinskoye Rural Settlement)
 Gyrova
 Ilyichi
 Isakova
 Ivankova
 Ivashkova
 Ivukova
 Kalinina (Leninskoye Rural Settlement)
 Kalinina (Verkh-Invenskoye Rural Settlement)
 Kamashor
 Kanamova
 Karbas
 Karp-Vaskina
 Karpina
 Kazarina
 Kekur (Leninskoye Rural Settlement)
 Kekur (Stepanovskoye Rural Settlement)
 Kharina
 Kharinova
 Kiprusheva
 Kirshina
 Klyuch-Mys
 Klyuchi
 Kokorina
 Konanova
 Konina
 Konshina
 Korchevnya
 Koroleva
 Koshtanova
 Kosogor (Beloyevskoye Rural Settlement)
 Kosogor (Leninskoye Rural Settlement)
 Kosva
 Kovylyaeva
 Kozhina
 Kozlova (Beloyevskoye Rural Settlement)
 Kozlova (Yogvinskoye Rural Settlement)
 Kukshinova
 Kurdyukova
 Kuva
 Kuzmina
 Kuzolova
 Kuzva
 Leleva
 Leninsk
 Levina (Verkh-Invenskoye Rural Settlement)
 Levina (Yogvinskoye Rural Settlement)
 Loginova
 Lopatina
 Lopvador
 Lyachkanova
 Malakhova (Beloyevskoye Rural Settlement)
 Malakhova (Oshibskoye Rural Settlement)
 Malaya Serva
 Malaya Sidorova
 Maltseva
 Martina
 Martyusheva
 Maximova
 Mazunina
 Mechkor
 Melekhina
 Minyadyn
 Mironova
 Mish-Piyan
 Miteva
 Mizhuyeva
 Molova
 Mosheva
 Moskvina
 Muchaki
 Mukmarova
 Nelsina
 Nepina
 Nesterova
 Nikolichi
 Novaya Shlyapina
 Novoselova
 Novoselovsky Lesouchastok
 Novozhilova
 Oshib
 Oshova
 Osipova (Beloyevskoye Rural Settlement)
 Osipova (Oshibskoye Rural Settlement)
 Ostapova
 Otevo
 Paleva (Beloyevskoye Rural Settlement)
 Paleva (Verkh-Invenskoye Rural Settlement)
 Panya
 Panyashor
 Parfenova (Leninskoye Rural Settlement)
 Parfenova (Verkh-Invenskoye Rural Settlement)
 Parshakova
 Patrukova
 Perkova
 Pershina
 Peshnigort
 Petukhova
 Pidayeva
 Pikhtovka
 Piter
 Pleshkova
 Plotnikova
 Pochkina
 Podgora
 Podvolochnaya
 Polva
 Ponosova
 Porskokova
 Proneva
 Pronina (Leninskoye Rural Settlement)
 Pronina (Verkh-Invenskoye Rural Settlement)
 Pronina (Yogvinskoye Rural Settlement)
 Pruddor
 Putoyeva
 Pyatina
 Rakshina
 Razina
 Rektanova
 Rocheva
 Rodeva
 Rodina (Leninskoye Rural Settlement)
 Rodina (Yogvinskoye Rural Settlement)
 Romanova
 Sadovaya
 Safonkova
 Samkovo
 Sanyukova
 Saranina
 Savina (Oshibskoye Rural Settlement)
 Savina (Yogvinskoye Rural Settlement)
 Seleva
 Senina (Beloyevskoye Rural Settlement)
 Senina (Verkh-Invenskoye Rural Settlement)
 Senkashor
 Sergeyeva
 Sergina
 Shaburova
 Shadrina
 Sharvol
 Shaydyrova
 Shipitsyna
 Shoryyv
 Sidorova (Leninskoye Rural Settlement)
 Sidorova (Verkh-Invenskoye Rural Settlement)
 Sidorshor
 Silina (Beloyevskoye Rural Settlement)
 Silina (Verkh-Invenskoye Rural Settlement)
 Sizeva
 Sludina
 Sordva
 Spasova
 Staraya Kuzva
 Staraya Shlyapina
 Stepanova
 Sylvozh
 Systerova
 Syuz-Pozya
 Tarasova
 Tarova
 Taskayeva
 Tebenkova
 Tikhonyata
 Tikhy
 Trapezniki
 Tretyeva
 Trosheva (Beloyevskoye Rural Settlement)
 Trosheva (Verkh-Invenskoye Rural Settlement)
 Tsybyan
 Uchat-Zon
 Uchkhoz
 Vaganova
 Valkova
 Vas-Palnik
 Vaseva
 Vasilyevka
 Vaskina Gar
 Vasyukova (Beloyevsky Selsoviet)
 Vasyukova (Kuvinsky Selsoviet)
 Vazh-Chigas
 Vazh-Palnik
 Vazh-Pashnya
 Velva-Baza
 Verkh-Buzhdom
 Verkh-Inva
 Verkh-Yusva
 Vesyoly Mys
 Vezhayka
 Vil-Chigas
 Vil-Chukyleva
 Vil-Konanova
 Vil-Shulay
 Vil-Zhukova
 Vizyay
 Vnukova
 Vyrova
 Yagodina
 Yakina
 Yarasheva
 Yegichi
 Yegorova
 Yepanova
 Yeremushkina
 Yermakova
 Yershova
 Yevdokimova
 Yevsina
 Yogva
 Yunga
 Zakharova
 Zapolye (Beloyevskoye Rural Settlement)
 Zapolye (Verkh-Invenskoye Rural Settlement)
 Zarechny Peshnigort
 Zhak-Klyuch
 Zhivyye
 Zyulganova

Kungursky District 
Rural localities in Kungursky District:

 Bym
 Kalinino
 Komsomolsky
 Shadeyka

Kuyedinsky District 
Rural localities in Kuyedinsky District:

 Alnyash
 Baraban
 Bolshaya Usa
 Bolshiye Kusty
 Bolshoy Gondyr
 Bolshoy Talmaz
 Gozhan
 Kalmiyary
 Kirga
 Kitryum
 Kuyeda
 Novy Shagirt
 Oshya
 Soyuz
 Stary Shagirt
 Tsentralnaya Usadba 3-go Goskonezavoda
 Udmurt-Shagirt
 Verkh-Gondyr
 Verkhyaya Sava

Lysva 
Rural localities in Lysva urban okrug:

 Kyn
 Kyn
 Nevidimka

Nytvensky District 
Rural localities in Nytvensky District:

 Mokino
 Novokoshkino

Okhansky District 
Rural localities in Okhansky District:

 Ostrozhka

Oktyabrsky District 
Rural localities in Oktyabrsky District:

 Samarova
 Shchuchye Ozero
 Yenapayevo

Ordinsky District 
Rural localities in Ordinsky District:

 Orda

Permsky District 
Rural localities in Permsky District:

 Alebastrovo
 Alexiki
 Anikino
 Bakharevka
 Balandino
 Bashkultayevo
 Baskiye
 Baybolovka
 Bereg Kamy (Kondratovskoye Rural Settlement)
 Bereg Kamy (Yugo-Kamskoye Rural Settlement)
 Bereznik
 Berezniki
 Bershet
 Bizyar
 Boldino
 Bolgary
 Bolshakino
 Bolshaya Mos
 Bolshoy Burtym
 Bolshoye Savino
 Brody
 Bulanki
 Bykovka
 Byrma
 Chebaki
 Chelyaba
 Chuvaki
 Chyornaya
 Denisyata
 Deriby
 Dikaya Gar
 Dubrovo
 Dvortsovaya Sludka
 Fedotovo
 Ferma
 Fomichi
 Froly
 Gamovo
 Gamy
 Gari
 Garyushki
 Glushata
 Gora
 Gorbunovo
 Gorshki
 Gorskaya
 Gribanovo
 Gruzdi
 Gusyata
 Kachka
 Kanabekovo
 Kapidony
 Karasye
 Kashino
 Kasimovo
 Kazantsy
 Kety
 Khokhlovka
 Khristoforovka
 Kichanovo
 Klestyata
 Klyuchi
 Klyuchiki
 Kochkino
 Koltsovo
 Kolyady
 Komarovo
 Kommuna
 Kondratovo
 Kosogory
 Kosoturikha
 Kostaryata
 Koyanovo
 Kozybayevo
 Krasava
 Krasny Voskhod
 Krokhovo
 Kukushtan
 Kuliki
 Kultayevo
 Kurashim
 Lesouchastok 831
 Lipaki
 Lobanovo
 Lozhki
 Lugovaya (Rozhdestvenskoye Rural Settlement)
 Lugovaya (Ust-Kachkinskoye Rural Settlement)
 Lyady
 Malaya
 Maloye Savino
 Maly Burtym
 Malyye Klestyata
 Martyanovo
 Merkushevo
 Mishurna
 Mokino
 Molokovo
 Morgali
 Moskvyata
 Mostovaya (Mostovskoye Rural Settlement)
 Mostovaya (Sylvenskoye Rural Settlement)
 Mulyanka
 Murashi
 Mysy
 Nazarovo
 Nestyukovo
 Nikulino
 Nizhniye Mully
 Nizhny Palnik
 Novoilyinskoye
 Novy
 Odina
 Ogryzkovo
 Oktyabrsky
 Olkhovka (settlement)
 Olkhovka (village)
 Osentsy
 Pany
 Pashnya
 Pazderino
 Pesyanka
 Petrovka
 Petryakhino
 Petushki
 Pishchalnikovo
 Plishki
 Poludennaya
 Polyudovo
 Protasy
 Rassolino
 Rassolnaya
 Rastyagayevo
 Rozhdestvenskoye
 Russkoye Pole
 Sakmary
 Savenki
 Sevastyany
 Shilovo
 Shirpy
 Shondikha
 Shugurovka
 Shulgino
 Shumki
 Shuvayata
 Sibir
 Simonki
 Skobelevka
 Sofrony
 Sokol
 Staroverovo
 Stashkovo
 Stepanovo
 Strashnaya
 Sukhaya
 Sukho-Platoshino
 Sukhobizyarka
 Suzdaly
 Sylva
 Syro-Platoshino
 Taranki
 Tayozhny
 Tishkino
 Troitsa
 Tupitsa
 Ust-Kachka
 Ust-Kurashim
 Ust-Pizya
 Ust-Tary
 Ustinovo
 Vanyuki
 Vashury
 Vasilyevka
 Vazelyata
 Verkh-Rechka
 Verkh-Rechki
 Verkh-Syra
 Verkhnyaya Khokhlovka
 Verkhnyaya Rassolnaya
 Yakunchiki
 Yanychi
 Yasyri
 Yermashi
 Yermozy
 Yezhi
 Yug
 Yugo-Kamsky
 Zaboloto
 Zaborye
 Zagrishinskoye
 Zamarayevo
 Zamulyanka
 Zaosinovo
 Zaozerye (Khokhlovskoye Rural Settlement)
 Zaozerye (Ust-Kachkinskoye Rural Settlement)
 Zapolye
 Zarechnaya (Gamovskoye Rural Settlement)
 Zarechnaya (Yugo-Kamskoye Rural Settlement)
 Zavedeniye
 Zaykovo
 Zhebrei
 Zhilya
 Zubki

Sivinsky District 
Rural localities in Sivinsky District:

 Severny Kommunar
 Siva

Solikamsky District 
Rural localities in Solikamsky District:

 Basim
 Chashkina
 Chyornoye
 Geologorazvedka
 Gorodishche
 Kasib
 Krasny Bereg
 Lyzib
 Maloye Gorodishche
 Nikino
 Nizhneye Moshevo
 Osokino
 Polovodovo
 Rodniki
 Sim
 Tokhtuyeva
 Tyulkino
 Urolka
 Usovsky
 Verkhneye Moshevo
 Vilva
 Volodino
 Zaton

Suksunsky District 
Rural localities in Suksunsky District:

 Kamenka
 Klyuchi
 Pepelyshi
 Sasykovo

Uinsky District 
Rural localities in Uinsky District:

 Ishteryaki
 Uinskoye

Usolsky District 
Rural localities in Usolsky District:

 Romanovo
 Taman
 Zheleznodorozhny

Vereshchaginsky District 
Rural localities in Vereshchaginsky District:

 Ageyevo
 Andronovka
 Boroduli
 Borodulino
 Borshchyovtsy
 Buzynyata
 Cherepanovo
 Denisovka
 Durovo
 Fedyashino
 Gavryukhino
 Gudyri
 Kalinichi
 Katayevo
 Klyuchi
 Kozhevniki
 Krutiki
 Kukety
 Kungur
 Kuzminka
 Kuznetsovo
 Lazarevo
 Leushkanovo
 Loginovo
 Lukino
 Martely
 Minino
 Moskvyata
 Nizhniye Garevskiye
 Nizhniye Khomyaki
 Oshchepkovo
 Posad
 Putino
 Putino
 Pyankovo
 Ryabiny
 Saltykovo
 Sarachi
 Sepych
 Shavrino
 Sidoryata
 Sivkovo
 Sobolyata
 Strizhi
 Subbotniki
 Tolkovyata
 Tyurikovo
 Volegi
 Volegovo
 Zakharyata
 Zapolye
 Zaytsy

Yelovsky District 
Rural localities in Yelovsky District:

 Bryukhovo
 Druzhnaya
 Pankovo
 Plishkino
 Shuldikha
 Yelovo
 Zonovo

Yurlinsky District 
Rural localities in Yurlinsky District:

 Berezova
 Bolshaya Polovina
 Bukreyeva
 Chugaynov Khutor
 Chuzhya
 Demidova
 Dubrovka
 Ivanovskaya
 Kelich
 Komsomolsky
 Pestereva
 Podkina
 Pozh
 Syuzva
 Titova
 Ust-Berezovka
 Ust-Zula
 Verkhnyaya Lobanova
 Vyatchina
 Yeloga
 Yum
 Yurla

Yusvinsky District 
Rural localities in Yusvinsky District:

 Arkhangelskoye
 Artamonovo
 Asanovo
 Bazhino
 Galyasher
 Kharino
 Kupros
 Maykor
 Pochasher
 Pozhva
 Timino
 Yusva
 Zhiginovo

See also 
 
 Lists of rural localities in Russia

References 

Perm Krai